The International African American Museum (IAAM) is a museum of African-American history being built in Charleston, South Carolina, on the site where Gadsden's Wharf, the disembarkation point of up to 40% of all American enslaved persons, once stood. Construction of the IAAM began in January 2020 after 20 years of planning. It is slated to open in January 2023.

Conception and construction
The idea of the museum was initiated by former Charleston Mayor Joseph P. Riley Jr. The city had previously sold the land to a restaurateur, but after construction on the site discovered traces of Gadsden's Wharf, Riley decided to repurchase the land. 

The construction budget of the museum is $75 million. Joe Riley raised money for the project as a private citizen. The $25 million private donation goal was met in 2018. The South Carolina General Assembly delayed a $25 million contribution to the project, which delayed construction of the 40,000-square-foot facility.

The city of North Charleston donated $1 million to the project. Keith Sumney, the mayor of North Charleston, stated that he hoped the museum would include an exhibit on Liberty Hill, a historically black neighborhood in North Charleston.

The design architect is Harry Cobb, of Pei Cobb Freed & Partners, working in collaboration with Moody Nolan architectural firm of Columbus, Ohio; the exhibition designer is Ralph Appelbaum Associates and the landscape designer is Walter Hood, of Oakland, California. The museum will be built on the Cooper River, with  a view towards Fort Sumter and out to the Atlantic Ocean.

References

External links
International African American Museum

African-American history in Charleston, South Carolina
Proposed museums in the United States
African-American museums in South Carolina
Museums in Charleston, South Carolina